Omphaloceps daria is a moth of the family Noctuidae. It is found in Malawi, Namibia, Tanzania, Zambia and Zimbabwe.

References

Moths described in 1895
Agaristinae
Lepidoptera of Malawi
Lepidoptera of Namibia
Lepidoptera of Tanzania
Lepidoptera of Zambia
Lepidoptera of Zimbabwe
Moths of Sub-Saharan Africa